Chris Cracknell  (born 6 August 1984 in Windsor, England) is a former England rugby union player. He coached the Fijiana team after being brought in by Ben Ryan in 2014. Cracknell attended Ridgeway (Junior School to Claires Court), Crosfields School and Shiplake College. The latter now hosts a 7s tournament in which schools compete for the 'Cracknell Cup' named in honour of the alumnus.

A flanker, Cracknell has previously played for the Cornish Pirates, Exeter Chiefs, Bath and Worcester Warriors.

In May 2010 Cracknell became subject of a WRFC and RFU investigation, when he became involved in an altercation with fellow Worcester player James Collins's father following the team's relegation decider match with Leeds. He was later fined and banned.

In 2015, Fiji Rugby Union confirmed that he has been chosen to be the assistant coach for the Fiji 7's team alongside Ben Ryan, who became the Fiji coach in 2013. In 2015, he was promoted as the head coach for the Fijiana team.

In 2022, Cracknell was named as the Belgium national team's coach, taking over from Frédéric Cocqu.

Honours and awards
After the 2016 Summer Olympics, Cracknell was awarded the Officer of the Order of Fiji.

References

External links
Worcester Warriors Profile
England Profile

1984 births
Living people
Bath Rugby players
Coaches of international rugby sevens teams
Commonwealth Games rugby sevens players of England
English expatriates in Fiji
English rugby union coaches
English rugby union players
Officers of the Order of Fiji
People educated at Claires Court School
Rugby sevens players at the 2010 Commonwealth Games
Rugby union players from Windsor, Berkshire
Worcester Warriors players